Max Brown (born 29 March 1999) is an English professional footballer who plays for Penrith as a striker.

Career
He turned professional in May 2018, alongside Sam Adewusi and Kieron Olsen. He spent two loan spells at Workington, one at the end of the 2017–18 season and one at the start of the 2018–19 season. He moved on loan to Kendal Town in November 2018, alongside Olsen. In December 2018 the loan was extended for a further month.

On 1 February 2019, Brown was one of four young professionals to leave Carlisle by mutual consent. He later signed for Penrith.

References

1999 births
Living people
English footballers
Carlisle United F.C. players
Workington A.F.C. players
Kendal Town F.C. players
Penrith F.C. players
English Football League players
Association football forwards